Salif Keita (born 1949) is a Malian singer-songwriter.

Salif Keita or Salif Keïta may also refer to:
Salif Keïta (Malian footballer) (born 1946), Malian footballer
Salif Keita (Senegalese footballer) (born 1975), Senegalese footballer
Salif Kéïta (Central African footballer) (born 1990), Central African Republican footballer